Alexeyevo is a rural locality (a village) in Staroselskoye Rural Settlement, Vologodsky District, Vologda Oblast, Russia. The population was 2 as of 2002.

Geography 
The distance to Vologda is 61 km, to Striznevo is 9 km. Talitsy, Rezvino, Gorka are the nearest rural localities.

References 

Rural localities in Vologodsky District